Deepak Sharma (born 1975) is an Indian television director and producer predominantly working in Hindi Television.

Early life and career
Sharma's career began in 1996 as a theatre worker in Delhi. He is the recipient of the Junior Fellowship for Punjabi Folk Theatre (NAQQAL) from the Ministry of Tourism & Culture, Department of Culture for the year 2002-2004. Later, Sharma started working as an assistant director to Santram Verma. He made his directorial debut with Kaisa Yeh Pyaar hai (2006), an Indian romantic drama series that aired on Sony TV, produced by Balaji Telefilms, starring Iqbal Khan, Neha Bamb, Hiten Tejwani and Jaya Bhattacharya.

This was followed by some of his most commercially successful television shows such as Kumkum, Kyunki... Saas Bhi Kabhi Bahu Thi, Kasam Se, Bhagyavidhata and Na Bole Tum Na Maine Kuch Kaha. He is also the founder of Vertika Films.

In 2013, Sharma ventured into short filmmaking with his Punjabi film Waapasi. The film received the award for 'Best Short Film – Jury Award' and Best Actor Award (Rohit Bhardwaj) at the 3rd Dada Saheb Film Festival 2013. At the Noida International Film Festival 2014, Deepak received the 'Best Director Award'.

Later in the year 2004, Sharma moved to Mumbai and joined Indian Television.

Television series
 Kaisa Ye Pyar Hai	- Sony TV
 Kyunki Saas Bhi Kabhi Bahu Thi - Star Plus
 Saathii Re - Star One
 Kasamh Se	- Zee TV
 Kasturi - Star Plus
 Kahe Naa Kahe - 9X
 Chhoona Hai Aasmaan - Star One
 Dahhej - 9X
 Kumkum - Star Plus
 Chand Ke Paar Chalo - NDTV Imagine
 Vivaah - Zee TV
 Ranbir Rano - Zee TV
 Bhagyavidhaata - Colors
 Yahaaan Main Ghar Ghar Kheli - Zee TV
 Geeta	- Zee TV
 Chhoti Si Zindagi - Zee TV
 Na Bole Tum Na Maine Kuch Kaha - Colors
 Bani – Ishq da Kalma - Colors

Short films
 Waapasi (Punjabi Language)

Awards and nominations 
2013 - Best Short Film (Waapasi) – Jury Award at the 3rd Dada Saheb Film Festival 2013
2014 - Best Director Award (Waapasi) at the Noida International Film Festival 2014
2014 - Best Film Award (Waapasi) at the PGF Film Festival

References 

1975 births
Living people
Indian television directors
Indian television producers
People from Delhi